François Roberge (born June 18, 1968 in Saint-Romuald, Quebec) is a Canadian curler from Breakeyville, Quebec.

Personal life
Robertge is employed as a team leader for SSQ Assurance/Insurance. He is in a relationship with Isabelle Gagné, and has three children. Roberge attended Université Laval.

Teams

References

External links
 
 François Roberge – Curling Canada Stats Archive

Living people
1968 births
People from Lévis, Quebec
Canadian male curlers
Curlers from Quebec
Brier champions
Université Laval alumni
Continental Cup of Curling participants
Canada Cup (curling) participants